Donald William Kaul (December 25, 1934 – July 22, 2018) was an American journalist and pundit. He received a bachelor's degree in 1958 from the University of Michigan, where he also obtained a master's degree in journalism in 1960. A finalist for the Pulitzer Prize for Commentary in 1987, and 1999, Kaul retired in 2000 after writing columns, mainly for The Des Moines Register, for more than 35 years. His satirical style and liberal views made him a household name in Iowa. In 2001 he resumed his column for OtherWords, a non-profit editorial service featuring progressive commentators. His last column appeared in 2017.

Besides his legacy of columns, which combined bite with crisp insights, Kaul co-founded The Des Moines Register’s annual, weeklong bike ride across Iowa, RAGBRAI. It began in 1973 with a column by Kaul, who launched the ride with John Karras, another Register writer.

In about 1963 Kaul began spelling Harlan Miller in writing The Register’s “Over the Coffee” column, and he took it over full-time in the spring of 1965. In 1970 the paper moved Kaul to its bureau in Washington, D.C. In 1983 he fell from grace with the paper’s editor, James Gannon, and was fired. Kaul was picked up by the Cedar Rapids (Iowa) Gazette, and his columns also were syndicated nationally. When Geneva Overholser became The Register’s editor, one of her first changes was to bring Kaul back in 1989.

"Kaul belongs in The Register,” she said then. “There aren't many world-class columnists around, and we've got one who's really our own."

Emily Schwartz Greco, his editor at OtherWords, wrote in 2012, “Don’s versatility is stunning. After half a century of penning columns, he writes with equal ease about football, economics, racism, and military spending.”

And the way Kaul penned those columns, the way he turned a phrase, was unforgettable for many of his readers. Richard Nixon “is to shifty what Larry Bird is to basketball,” he wrote in a 1986 column for The Register. Kaul unrelentingly and affectionately teased Iowa girls’ basketball for its slow pace, calling for it to be timed with an “hour glass” and saying it drove crowds “delirious with apathy.” Describing riders of RAGBRAI as “my kind of people,” he explained: “They come for a little fun and to see whether it’s true what they say about coronaries. They’re not into finishing first, they’re into finishing.”

A Washingtonian magazine poll of the nation’s 200 largest newspapers voted Kaul “the most underrated syndicated columnist.” In 1984 he was keynote speaker at Drake University Law School’s Supreme Court Celebration Banquet, an invitation usually extended to governors, members of Congress and Supreme Court justices. For a time in the 1980s he was a commentator on National Public Radio. Register editors could count on Kaul to generate letters from readers, pro and con, and other Iowa columnists followed his work. One called him “the George Will or Rush Limbaugh of the left.”

Kaul has always worn his liberalism on his forehead. Noting the political benefits of military contracts scattered by design among many congressional districts, he wrote, “Congress has its faults – it is for the most part cowardly, venal and self-aggrandizing – but give it this: it is absolutely ingenious in its efforts to protect the military budget from the scourge of peace.”

But liberalism had little to do with the fun he had claiming credit for terms defining girls’ basketball: “standing jump shot, the slow-break offense, the near-dribble.” Or, in a years-long harangue against The Sound of Music, he said the film is so syrupy that it stands alone “on the condemned list of the Association for the Prevention of Diabetes.”

He suffered a heart attack on the Fourth of July, 2012, after detouring from his semi-vegan ways to eat a hotdog. He still met a deadline, filing a column three days later, but observed, “Life is full of little ironies, some of which will kill you.”

He took a break from writing, then decided to resume, just before the Sandy Hook Elementary massacre. It spurred his “madder-than-hell” call for ending gun violence. “Repeal the Second Amendment, the part about guns anyway,” he wrote, urging that the NRA be declared a terrorist organization and that owning an unlicensed assault rifle be made a felony.

“If some people refused to give up their guns, that ‘prying the guns from their cold, dead hands’ thing works for me,” he went on. “Then I would tie Mitch McConnell and John Boehner, our esteemed Republican leaders, to the back of a Chevy pickup and drag them around a parking lot until they saw the light on gun control.”

Protests followed, led by anti-gun control activists who flooded his email and phone with nasty, sometimes threatening, messages. Kaul explained he was writing satirically about the GOP leaders, but to little avail. “Perhaps my column jumped the shark a bit,” he said. “I was angry. But worse would have been to watch those little bodies being carried out of the Newtown school, shrug, and say ‘Gee, that’s terrible. We’re going to have to do something about that someday, if the NRA approves.’ That would have been immoral.”

Many of Kaul’s columns are reprinted in three books – How to Light a Water Heater and Other War Stories a Random Collection of Random Essays; THE END OF THE WORLD AND OTHER ENTERTAINMENTS; and They’re All in It Together: When Good Things Happen to Bad People, edited by his son Christopher Kaul to provide additional context.

On January 11, 2018, Kaul revealed that the cancer in his prostate has spread to his skeleton and that he will no longer take treatments. He was in the end stages of his battle with cancer and didn't expect to live beyond the year.

Film

References

External links
 Donald Kaul Bio and list of columns

1934 births
2018 deaths
American columnists
Journalists from Iowa
University of Michigan alumni